Bolsøya is an island in Molde Municipality in Møre og Romsdal county, Norway. The  island lies in the Romsdalsfjorden at the entrance to the Fannefjorden. The island is connected to the mainland by the Bolsøy Bridge and to the town of Molde by the Fannefjord Tunnel, both on County Road 64. The island was in the former municipality of Bolsøy prior to its merger into Molde Municipality. The historic site of Bolsøy Church was on this island, but the church was moved to Røbekk on the mainland and the old church was torn down in 1906.

See also
List of islands of Norway

References

Molde
Islands of Møre og Romsdal